Victor Rogut (born 28 February 1979) is a Moldovan former swimmer, who specialized in long-distance freestyle events. He is a two-time Olympian (2000 and 2004) and a member of the Moldova Swimming Team.

Rogut made his official debut at the 2000 Summer Olympics in Sydney, where he competed in the 400 m freestyle. Swimming in heat two, he edged out Turkey's Aytekin Mindan to claim a sixth spot and thirty-eighth overall by four hundredths of a second (0.04) in 4:01.42.

At the 2004 Summer Olympics in Athens, Rogut qualified again for the 400 m freestyle, by achieving a FINA B-standard of 4:01.05 from the Russian Open Championships in Moscow. He challenged seven other swimmers in heat two, including his former rival Mindan and Bulgaria's Petar Stoychev, who later emerged as a top favorite in open water. Rogut pulled off another sixth-place finish in the same heat from four years ago in 4:01.68, just 0.24 of a second off his entry time. Rogut failed to reach the top 8 final, as he placed thirty-fifth overall in the preliminaries.

References

1984 births
Living people
Moldovan male freestyle swimmers
Olympic swimmers of Moldova
Swimmers at the 2000 Summer Olympics
Swimmers at the 2004 Summer Olympics
Sportspeople from Chișinău
21st-century Moldovan people